Vice Admiral Sir Sydney Moffatt Raw KBE CB (1898–1967) was a Royal Navy officer who went on to be Fourth Sea Lord.

Naval career
Raw served in World War I and fought at the Battle of Jutland in 1916. He also served in World War II and led the naval work on the recovery of the submarine HMS Thetis off Anglesey in 1939 before being given command of the submarine tender HMS Medway in 1940 and being appointed Chief of Staff to the Admiral (Submarines) in 1942. He also commanded the cruiser HMS Phoebe during operations on the Burma coast from 1944.

In 1947 he was appointed Commodore at the Royal Naval Barracks Devonport before becoming Flag Officer Submarines in 1950 and Fourth Sea Lord and Chief of Supplies and Transport in 1952.

References

|-

1898 births
1967 deaths
Lords of the Admiralty
Royal Navy vice admirals
Royal Navy officers of World War I
Royal Navy officers of World War II
Knights Commander of the Order of the British Empire
Companions of the Order of the Bath